10D or 10d may refer to:
Canon EOS 10D, a digital SLR camera
Nebraska Link 10D, a part of the Nebraska highway system
 A ten-penny nail

See also
D10 (disambiguation)